Álvaro López-García (1941-2019) was a Spanish astronomer, professor of astronomy at University of Valencia and director of the Valencia University Observatory during the years 1968-2000. He was a specialist in astrometry and the dynamics of minor planets, and had discovered numerous of these bodies since the early 1980s, in collaboration with astronomer Henri Debehogne.

Awards and honors 
The main-belt asteroid 4657 Lopez, discovered by Nikolai Chernykh in 1979, was named in his honor.

List of discovered minor planets 

 co-discoveries made with: H. Debehogne

See also

References 
 

1941 births

Discoverers of asteroids
Living people
20th-century Spanish astronomers